This article is about the coat of arms of the German state of Rhineland-Palatinate.

Overview
The flag symbolizes the dedication of Rhineland-Palatinate to Germany (therefore the black-red-gold tricolour) as well as the democratic traditions of Germany. The Palatinate is therefore connected to these colours.

The coat of arms, an integral part of the state flag, symbolises the three predominant powers in the region before the French Revolution of the late 18th century: 

 the red cross on silver represents the Archbishop and  prince-elector of Trier
 the silver wheel on red (Wheel of Mainz) represents the Archbishop and prince-elector of Mainz
 the crowned golden lion on black represents the prince-elector of the Palatinate (see: Palatine Lion)

The  (people's crown) consists of vine leaves and shows the importance of this crop for local agriculture.

Legal status

References

See also
Coat of arms of Prussia
Coat of arms of Germany
Origin of the coats of arms of German federal states

Rhineland-Palatinate
Rhineland-Palatinate
Culture of Rhineland-Palatinate
Rhineland-Palatinate
Rhineland-Palatinate
Rhineland-Palatinate
Rhineland-Palatinate